Dilaridae is a family of Euneuropteran insects in the order Neuroptera, known as "pleasing lacewings". They were formerly placed in the paraphyletic superfamily Hemerobioidea, though the group is currently placed in the monophyletic superfamily Dilaroidea as a sister group to Mantispoidea and Osmyloidea.

There are about 9 genera and at least 100 described species in Dilaridae.

Genera
These genera belong to the family Dilaridae:
 Berothella  
 †Cascadilar  - (Priabonian Baltic amber,) 
 †Cretadilar  - (Cenomanian. Burmese amber, Myanmar)  
 †Cretodilar  - (Cenomanian Burmese amber, Myanmar) 
 Dilar  
 Lidar 
 Nallachius 
 Neonallachius  
Other genera previously considered to belong to family as the subfamily Cretanallachiinae have subsequently been moved to Kalligrammatidae.

References

External links

Hemerobiiformia
Neuroptera families